This is a list of breweries in Tennessee, a U.S. state.

Microbreweries and regional breweries
Microbreweries < 15,000 barrels per annum and Regional Breweries are 15,000 to 6,000,000 barrels per annum.

Chattanooga area 
 Big Frog Brewing Company – Chattanooga
 Big River Grille & Brewing Works – Chattanooga 
 Chattanooga Brewing Company – Chattanooga
 Five Wits Brewing Company - Chattanooga
 Heaven & Ale Brewing Company - Chattanooga
 Hutton & Smith Brewing Company – Chattanooga
 Mad Knight Brewing Company – Chattanooga
Naked River Brewing Company – Chattanooga
 OddStory Brewing Company – Chattanooga
Terminal Brew House – Chattanooga

Clarksville area 
 Blackhorse Pub & Brewery - Clarksville, Knoxville

Cookeville area 
 Hix Farm Brewery – Cookeville
 Jig Head Brewing Company – Cookeville
 Red Silo Brewing Company – Cookeville

Franklin area 
 Huckleberry Brewing Co – Franklin

Knoxville area 
Alliance Brewing Company – Knoxville
 Balter Beerworks – Knoxville
 Blackhorse Pub & Brewery - Knoxville, Clarksville
 Chisholm Tavern Brewery  – Knoxville
 Clinch River Brewing – Knoxville, Norris  
 Crafty Bastard Brewing  – Knoxville
 Elst Brewing Company – Knoxville
 Fanatic Brewing –  Knoxville
 Geezers Brewery – Knoxville
 Hexagon Brewing Company  – Knoxville
 Last Days of Autumn Brewery  – Knoxville
 Pretentious Beer Company – Knoxville
 Printshop Beer Company – Knoxville
 Schulz Bräu Brewing – Knoxville
 Smoky Mountain Brewery – Knoxville, Gatlinburg, Maryville, Oak Ridge, Pigeon Forge, Sevierville
 Woodruff Brewing Company  – Knoxville

Memphis area 
 Bosco's Restaurant and Brewing Company – Memphis
 Crosstown Brewing Company – Memphis
 Ghost River Brewing – Memphis
 High Cotton Brewing Company– Memphis
 Memphis Made Brewing Company – Memphis
 Rock’n Dough Pizza & Brew Company Company – Memphis
 Wiseacre Brewing Company – Memphis

Murfreesboro area 
 Cedar Glade Brews – Murfreesboro
 Mayday Brewery – Murfreesboro
 Panther Creek Brews - Murfreesboro
 Steel Barrel Brewery – Murfreesboro

Nashville area 
 Bearded Iris Brewing Company – Nashville
 Black Abbey Brewing Company – Nashville
 Blackstone Brewing Company- Nashville
 Bold Patriot Brewing Company - Nashville
 Crazy Gnome Brewery – Nashville
 Czann's Brewing Company – Nashville
 Diskin Cider – Nashville
 East Nashville Beer Works – Nashville
 Fat Bottom Brewing Company – Nashville
 Hap & Harry's  – Nashville
 Harding House Brewing Company – Nashville
 Honky Tonk Brewing Company – Nashville
 Jackalope Brewing Company – Nashville
 Jubilee Craft Beer Company – Nashville  
 Little Harpeth Brewing – Nashville
 Monday Night Brewing – Nashville
 Nashville Brewing Company – Nashville
 New Heights Brewing Company – Nashville
 Smith & Lentz Brewing – Nashville
 Southern Grist Brewing Company – Nashville
 Rock Bottom Restaurant & Brewery – Nashville
 TailGate Brewing – Nashville
 Tennessee Brew Works – Nashville
 Tennfold Brewing – Nashville
 Turtle Anarchy Brewing Company – Nashville
 Various Artists Brewing – Nashville
 Yazoo Brewing Company – Nashville

Tri-Cities area (Bristol/Johnson City/Kingsport) 
 Bristol Station Brews & Taproom  – Bristol, VA
 Elder Brew  – Bristol, TN
 Great Oak Brewing – Johnson City
 Gypsy Circus Cider Company   – Kingsport
 Holston River Brewing Company – Bristol, TN
 Johnson City Brewing Company – Johnson City
 JRH Brewing – Johnson City
 Little Animals Brewery – Johnson City
 State Street Brewing – Bristol, VA
Watauga Brewing Company - Johnson City
 Yee-Haw Brewing Company – Johnson City

Other areas 
East Tennessee
Clinch River Brewing – Norris, Knoxville
Depot Street Brewing  – Jonesborough
 Lilly Pad Hopyard Brewery – Lancing
 Monkey Town Brewing Company  – Dayton
 Round 6 Brewing  – Maryville
 Smoky Mountain Brewery – Gatlinburg, Maryville, Oak Ridge, Pigeon Forge, Sevierville, Knoxville
 Tri-Hop Brewery – Maryville

Middle Tennessee
 Asgard Brewing Company – Columbia
Bad Idea Brewing - Columbia 
 Big Trouble Brewing Company - Gallatin
 Common John Brewing Co - Manchester
 Half Batch Brewing Company  – Hendersonville
 Happy Trails Brewing Co. – Sparta
 Mill Creek Brewing Company – Nolensville
 Ole Shed Brewing Company – Tullahoma

West Tennessee
 Meddlesome Brewing Company – Cordova
 Perrylodgic Brewing Company – Paris
 Hub City Brewing – Jackson

Former breweries 
Tennessee Brewery, Memphis 1887-1954
 Nashville Brewing Company, Nashville 1859-1890
 Green Dragon Pub and Brewery, Murfreesboro 2014-2019

See also 
 Beer in the United States
 List of breweries in the United States
 List of microbreweries

References

Tennessee
Breweries